Markus Ehrhard (born 14 July 1976) is a retired German football player.

Career 

He made his debut on the professional league level in the 2. Bundesliga for VfL Bochum on 3 February 2002 when he came on as a substitute in the 90th minute in the game against 1. FSV Mainz 05.

References

1976 births
Living people
German footballers
VfL Bochum players
VfL Bochum II players
SG Wattenscheid 09 players
KFC Uerdingen 05 players
2. Bundesliga players
Association football defenders
Association football midfielders